The 2010–11 Senior Women's Challenger Trophy was the second edition of India's 50 over Women's Challenger Trophy. Three teams made up of the best players in India competed in a round-robin group, with the top two advancing to the final. Matches were held at the Dr. Y. S. Rajasekhara Reddy ACA–VDCA Cricket Stadium, Visakhapatnam across four days in December 2010. The tournament was won by India Blue, who beat India Green in the final by 7 wickets.

Competition format
The three teams played in a round-robin group, playing each other team once, with the top two advancing to the final. Matches were played using a 50 over format.

The group worked on a points system with positions with the group being based on the total points. Points were awarded as follows:

Win: 4 points. 
Tie: 2 points. 
Loss: 0 points.
No Result/Abandoned: 2 points.

If points in the final table are equal, teams are separated by their Net Run Rate.

Squads

Standings

Source: CricketArchive

Group stage

Final

Statistics

Most runs

Source: ESPNCricinfo

Most wickets

Source: ESPNCricinfo

References

2010–11 Indian women's cricket
2010-11
Domestic cricket competitions in 2010–11
Senior Women's Challenger Trophy